The southern shovel-nosed snake (Brachyurophis semifasciatus) is a species of snake native to southern Australia.

References
 

Snakes of Australia
semifasciatus
Taxa named by Albert Günther